The St. Louis Cardinals Radio Network is a United States radio network that broadcasts St. Louis Cardinals baseball games. The network consists of 111 stations1 (including the flagship station) (52 AM, 58 FM) and six FM translators in nine states (four in the Midwest and five in the South). Its flagship station is KMOX in St. Louis. Due to an earlier deal with KTRS, it is still a partial owner of that station although Cardinals games no longer air on KTRS (which they did for the 2006-2010 seasons).

As of the 2022 season, the broadcast team consists of play-by-play announcer John Rooney and color analyst Rick Horton. Mike Claiborne occasionally assists on play-by-play, while Tom Ackerman, Kevin Wheeler, and Joe Pott host the pre- and post-game shows.

Station list

Flagship (1 station)
KMOX 1120: St. Louis (2011–present; was also the flagship from 1928-1940 and again from 1955-2005)

Affiliates

Arkansas (13 stations)
KBTA 1340:  Batesville
KAFN 690: Benton
KAGH 800: Crossett (Daytime only)
KAGH-FM 104.9: Crossett
KYEL 105.5: Danville
KHGA 103.9: Earle (Jonesboro area)
KURM-FM 100.3: Gravette
KHGG-FM 103.5: Mansfield (Fort Smith area)
KVOM 800: Morrilton
KTLO 1240: Mountain Home
KDRS 1490: Paragould
KPOC-FM 104.1: Pocahontas
KAGE 1580: Van Buren (Fort Smith area)
KCON 92.7: Vilonia (Conway area)

Hawaii (1 station)
KHLO 850: Hilo

Illinois (30 stations + 8 translators)
WTIM 870: Assumption
W300EH 107.9: Assumption (rebroadcasts WTIM)
WJBC 1230: Bloomington
WBYS 1560: Canton
WCEZ 93.9: Carthage (Keokuk, Iowa, area)
WROY 1460: Carmi
WDAN 1490: Danville
WSOY 1340: Decatur
WCRA 1090: Effingham (daytime only)
W284BI 104.7: Effingham (rebroadcasts WCRA)
WEBQ-FM 102.3: Eldorado (Harrisburg area)
WOKZ 105.9: Fairfield
WGIL 1400: Galesburg
WEAI 107.1: Jacksonville
WKEI 1450: Kewanee
W282AL 104.3: Kewanee (rebroadcasts WKEI)
WLPO 1220: Lasalle
WSMI 1540: Litchfield, Illinois (daytime only)
WLUV 1520: Loves Park
WREZ 105.5: Metropolis (Paducah, Kentucky area)
WMIX-FM 94.1: Mount Vernon
WINI 1420: Murphysboro
WHQQ 98.9: Neoga (Mattoon-Effingham area)
WVLN 740: Olney
WSEI 92.9: Olney
WSEY 95.7: Oregon (Dixon area)
W280EG 103.9: Paris (rebroadcasts WLPO)
WIRL 1290: Peoria (stereo)
WGEM-FM 105.1: Quincy
WJEK 95.3: Rantoul (Champaign area; simulcasts with WSJK)
WTAY 1570: Robinson
W262BI 100.3: Robinson (rebroadcasts WTAY)
W298CD 107.5: Shelbyville (rebroadcasts WTIM)
WHCO 1230: Sparta
WTAX 1240: Springfield
W298AP 107.5: Springfield (rebroadcasts WTAX)
W241CF 96.1: Taylorville (rebroadcasts WTIM)
WSJK 93.5: Tuscola (Champaign area; simulcasts with WJEK)
WHET 97.7: West Frankfort (Marion area)

Indiana (3 stations)
WQKZ 98.5: Ferdinand
WQTY 93.3: Linton (Vincennes/Terre Haute area)
WMVI 106.7: Mt. Vernon

Iowa (7 stations)
KJAN 1220: Atlantic (C-QUAM stereo)
KMA-FM 99.1: Clarinda (Shenendoah area)
KXNO 1460: Des Moines
KMAQ-FM 95.1: Maquoketa
KCOB 1280:  Newton
KCOB-FM 95.9: Newton

Kentucky (7 stations + 1 translator)
WCBL-FM 99.1: Grand Rivers (Benton area)
WSON 860: Henderson (C-QUAM stereo)
WFMW 730: Madisonville
WYMC 1430: Mayfield
WNBS 1340: Murray
W243CU 96.5: Sebree (rebroadcasts WSON)
WMSK-FM 101.3: Sturgis
WGKY 95.9: Wickliffe

Mississippi (2 stations)
WTUP 1490: Tupelo
WVBG 1490: Vicksburg

Missouri (36 stations)
KAAN-FM 95.5: Bethany
KDBB 104.3: Bonne Terre (Park Hills area)
KATI 94.3: California (Jefferson City area)
KOEA 97.5: Doniphan
KSSZ 93.9: Fayette (Columbia area)
KTGR-FM 100.5: Fulton
KHMO 1070: Hannibal
KBTC 1250: Houston
KZYM 1230: Joplin
KIRX 1450: Kirksville
KJEL 103.7: Lebanon
KJFM 102.1: Louisiana
KIRK 99.9: Macon
KYRX 97.3: Marble Hill (Cape Girardeau area)
KMEM-FM 100.5: Memphis
KXEO 1340: Mexico (C-QUAM stereo)
KRES 104.7: Moberly
KKBL 95.9: Monett
KNEM 1240: Nevada
KNMO-FM 97.5: Nevada
KTMO 106.5: New Madrid (Kennett area)
KBDZ 93.1: Perryville
KPPL 92.5: Poplar Bluff
KTTR-FM 99.7: Saint James (Rolla area)
KESJ 1550: Saint Joseph
KSMO 1340: Salem
KSIS 1050: Sedalia
KBXB 97.9: Sikeston
KXUS 97.3: Springfield
KTUI-FM 102.1: Sullivan
KSAR 92.3: Thayer
KFBD-FM 97.9: Waynesville
KWPM 1450: West Plains
KUKU-FM 100.3: Willow Springs
KWKJ 98.5: Windsor (Warrensburg area)

Oklahoma (5 stations)
KWON 1400: Bartlesville
KCEC 1390: Enid
KREF 1400: Norman (Oklahoma City area)
WBBZ 1230: Ponca City
KGFF 1450: Shawnee

Tennessee (8 stations)
WMFS-FM 92.9: Bartlett
WKFN 540: Clarksville
WTRO 1450: Dyersburg
WHNY-FM 104.7: Henry (Paris area)
WZLT 99.3: Lexington
WMFS 680: Memphis
WTRB 1570: Ripley
KYTN 104.9: Union City

Former flagships (1 station)
KTRS 550: St. Louis (2006-2010)

Former affiliates (2 stations)
KKON 790: Kealakekua, Hawaii
WTIM-FM 97.3: Taylorville, Illinois

See also
List of XM Satellite Radio channels
List of Sirius Satellite Radio stations
List of St. Louis Cardinals broadcasters

References

 https://www.mlb.com/cardinals/schedule/radio-affiliates

External links
2020 Cardinals radio affiliate map
Meduci.com's list of A.M. Stereo radio stations
Announcers' biographies
St. Louis Cardinals Radio History

St. Louis Cardinals
Major League Baseball on the radio
Sports radio networks in the United States